Rud Rish (also Romanized as Rūd Rīsh and Rūd-e Rīsh; also known as Rūrīsh) is a village in Ajam Rural District, Dishmok District, Kohgiluyeh County, Kohgiluyeh and Boyer-Ahmad Province, Iran. At the 2006 census, its population was 290, in 52 families.

References 

Populated places in Kohgiluyeh County